Patricia Elizabeth Wilka Materi de Battilana (born September 3, 1972 in Asunción) is a Paraguayan pistol shooter. At age thirty-five, Wilka made her official debut at the 2008 Summer Olympics in Beijing, where she competed in the women's 10 m air pistol shooting. She finished in last place out of forty-four shooters in the qualifying rounds, after she was forced to retire in her third attempt, with a total score of 208 points.

References

External links
NBC 2008 Olympics profile

Paraguayan female sport shooters
Living people
Olympic shooters of Paraguay
Shooters at the 2008 Summer Olympics
Sportspeople from Asunción
1972 births